Brain coral is a common name given to various corals in the families Mussidae and Merulinidae, so called due to their generally spheroid shape and grooved surface which resembles a brain. Each head of coral is formed by a colony of genetically identical polyps which secrete a hard skeleton of calcium carbonate; this makes them important coral reef builders like other stony corals in the order Scleractinia.
Brain corals are found in shallow warm water coral reefs in all the world's oceans. They are part of the phylum Cnidaria, in a class called Anthozoa or "flower animals". The lifespan of the largest brain corals is 900 years. Colonies can grow as large as 1.8 m (6 ft) or more in height.

Brain corals extend their tentacles to catch food at night.  During the day, they use their tentacles for protection by wrapping them over the grooves on their surface. The surface is hard and offers good protection against fish or hurricanes. Branching corals, such as staghorn corals, grow more rapidly, but are more vulnerable to storm damage.
Like other genera of corals, brain corals feed on small drifting animals, and also receive nutrients provided by the algae which live within their tissues. The behavior of one of the most common genera, Favia, is semiaggressive; it will sting other corals with its extended sweeper tentacles during the night.

The grooved surface of brain corals has been used by scientists to investigate methods of giving spherical wheels appropriate grip strength.

Genera

Barabattoia Yabe and Sugiyama, 1941
Bikiniastrea Wells, 1954
Caulastraea Dana, 1846 – candy cane coral
Colpophyllia Milne-Edwards and Haime, 1848 – boulder brain coral or large-grooved brain coral
Cyphastrea Milne-Edwards and Haime, 1848
Diploastrea Matthai, 1914 – diploastrea brain coral or honeycomb coral
Diploria Milne-Edwards and Haime, 1848 – grooved brain coral
Echinopora Lamarck, 1816
Erythrastrea Pichon, Scheer and Pillai, 1983
Favia Oken, 1815
Favites Link, 1807 – moon, pineapple, brain, closed brain, star, worm, or honeycomb coral
Goniastrea Milne-Edwards and Haime, 1848
Leptastrea Milne-Edwards and Haime, 1848
Leptoria Milne-Edwards and Haime, 1848 – great star coral
Manicina Ehrenberg, 1834
Montastraea de Blainville, 1830 – great star coral
Moseleya Quelch, 1884
Oulastrea Milne-Edwards and Haime, 1848
Oulophyllia Milne-Edwards and Haime, 1848
Parasimplastrea Sheppard, 1985  
Platygyra Ehrenberg, 1834
Plesiastrea Milne-Edwards and Haime, 1848
Solenastrea Milne-Edwards and Haime, 1848

Gallery

References

Scleractinia
Invertebrate common names
Polyphyletic groups